
Gmina Ząbkowice Śląskie is an urban-rural gmina (administrative district) in Ząbkowice Śląskie County, Lower Silesian Voivodeship, in south-western Poland.

Neighbouring gminas
Gmina Ząbkowice Śląskie is bordered by the town of Piława Górna and the gminas of Bardo, Ciepłowody, Kamieniec Ząbkowicki, Niemcza, Stoszowice and Ziębice.

Villages
Apart from the town of Ząbkowice Śląskie, the gmina contains the villages of Bobolice, Braszowice, Brodziszów, Grochowiska, Jaworek, Kluczowa, Koziniec, Olbrachcice Wielkie, Pawłowice, Rakowice, Sadlno, Sieroszów, Siodłowice, Stolec, Strąkowa, Sulisławice, Szklary, Szklary-Huta, Tarnów and Zwrócona.

Twin towns – sister cities

Gmina Ząbkowice Śląskie is twinned with:

 Bran, Romania
 Červený Kostelec, Czech Republic
 Fontenay-aux-Roses, France
 Sławno, Poland
 Uchte, Germany
 Wiesloch, Germany

References

Zabkowice Slaskie
Ząbkowice Śląskie County